Bin Roye is a 2015 Pakistani romantic drama film directed by Momina Duraid and Shahzad Kashmiri. The film is produced by Momina Duraid and stars Humayun Saeed, Mahira Khan, Armeena Khan, Zeba Bakhtiar, Javed Sheikh and others. One of the movie songs is directed by Haissam Hussain. Bin Roye is based on the original novel Bin Roye Ansoo by Farhat Ishtiaq. The film was released worldwide on 18 July 2015, the day of Eid-ul-Fitr. Bin Roye was praised by the critics. It is the tenth-highest-grossing Pakistani film. Bin Roye was later adapted into a television series with the same name, that premiered on Hum TV on 2 October 2016.

Plot
The film starts by introducing Saba Shafiq (Mahira Khan) and Irtaza's (Humayun Saeed) relationship. Saba is hopelessly in love with Irtaza, but he treats her like his best friend, not a love interest. Irtaza then leaves for the US for two years, where he meets Saman Shafiq (Armeena Khan) and falls in love with her. Saman is Saba's elder sister, and she was given to her uncle and aunt as a child. Saman's foster parents die in a plane crash which was headed to Germany, and Irtaza brings her back to Pakistan. Upon learning that she has an elder sister, Saba is at first overjoyed, but her happiness quickly turns to disdain when she finds out that Irtaza and Saman are in love and are to be married.

Later, Irtaza and Saman come to Karachi with their son Maaz. On Maaz's birthday, Saman plans to get a birthday cake and some flowers for her mother. However, tragedy occurs as Saman is hit by a car in front of Saba (who once prayed to God that Saman should die, because she wanted to marry her cousin Irtaza and hated the fact that her sister is marrying him). Irtaza calls the ambulance and they take her to the hospital, however, Saman dies in the ambulance. Before dying, she whispers in Saba's ears that both Irtaza and Maaz are now Saba's. Meanwhile, as Maaz is a child in need of a mother's love, Saba's grandmother suggests to her parents that she should marry Irtaza. Saba doesn't agree, and says yes to marrying someone else. On her wedding day Irtaza finds out that Saba's family is unaware that the man she's marrying is already married and has a son. Irtaza gets very angry and confronts Saba, who cries and tells him that it's too late to stop the wedding now since they are actually at the wedding. However, Irtaza drags her to their family and tells them the truth. Their family is shocked and they decide Saba should not marry that guy. Then, to the surprise of everyone present, Irtaza announces that he will marry Saba. Saba has a difficult time accepting her marriage and was in trauma that she might be the cause of Saman's death, but after a dramatic turn of events finally Irtaza came to know the whole story and recognized the love of Saba, and declares his love for her. The movie ends with Irtaza and Saba together at last.

Cast 
 Humayun Saeed as Irtaza hashmi
 Mahira Khan as Saba Shafiq/Saba Irtaza
 Armeena Rana Khan as Saman Shafiq/Saman Irtaza
 Zeba Bakhtiar as Saba and Saman's mother  
 Javed Sheikh as Saba and Saman's father 
 Jahanzeb Khan as Zafar
 Azra Mansoor as Dadi 
 Junaid Khan as Safir
 Huma Nawab as Safeer's mother
 Adeel Hussain as Himself (special appearance in song "Balle Balle")
 Mujtaba Khan as young Irtaza
 Annie Zaidi as Saman's Foster mother
 Rashid Khawaja as Saman's Foster father
 Faiza Hasan as Singer
 Sidra Batool as Saba's friend

Production

Development
Bin Roye was developed by Hum TV's senior producer Momina Duraid of Momina Duraid Productions, Duraid choose Shehzaad Kashmiri along with herself to direct the film. Story of film is based on Farhat Ishtiaq's novel, Bin Roye Ansoo. Screenplay is also written by Ishtiaq, while cinematography is done by Farhan Alam. Song composition is done by Shiraz Uppal, Sahir Ali Bagha, Shani Arshad and Waqr Ali. Two songs in the film have been directed by Sarmad Sultan Khoosat, Asim Raza and Haissam Hussain.

Casting
Producer Momina Duraid choose Mahira Khan, along with Humayun Saeed and Armeena Rana Khan to portray the leading roles, however Zeba Bakhtiar, Javed Sheikh and Azra Mehmood were selected to portray supporting roles. Mahira Khan, after her success in Humsafar, Shehr-e-Zaat and Bol, was selected to portray the role of Saba. Khan continued with her film Raees and managed to work for Bin Roye. Humayun Saeed was selected to portray the role of main lead, Irtiza while Armeena Khan, after completing her television series Karb, joined the shoot.

Filming
Filming began in 2014 and was completed in the late March 2015. The film premiered in July 2015, after the completion of filming. Teasers were released in late April which were heavily praised for their shooting and cast while music was released in June 2015. Shooting was extensively done in Karachi, with some chunks being shot in parts of California, United States.

Music 
Bin Roye'''s soundtrack received positive reviews from critics and the public alike. The song "Balle Balle" was on the top of the charts on the Bollywood song website "Saavn" for a week.

 Release 
Bin Roye released in more than 10 countries including; the United States, the United Kingdom, Canada, Middle East, and United Arab Emirates on 19 July 2015. Bin Roye initially released in 83 screens in Pakistan but later increased to 89 screens after first two days. Bin Roye was initially set to screen on 60 screens in India, but it was deferred in the state of Maharashtra because of Maharashtra Navnirman Chitrapat Karmachari Sena's protest. Bin Roye also faced release issue in Kolkata, India. Bin Roye released in India in 81 screens on 7 August 2015, making it biggest release ever for Pakistani film in India.

Reception
Box office
Bin Roye had grossed  worldwide in first four days. Bin Roye grossed  in first three days in Pakistan. Film took a very good opening and collected  on Day One. Film saw full house showings at Super Cinemas, Cinestar and Conegold as film recorded 90–95% occupancies at big metros and overall 75+% occupancies which is a very good result.

The film collected 3.56 crores in its first week, 7 crores in its second week and 85 lacs in its third week from Pakistan. By the end of its run the film had collected 11 crores approximately from Pakistan. Bin Roye grossed 8.5 crore at U.K. Box Office, 7.35 crores at U.A.E Box Office, 2.4 crores from US Box Office, 50 lacs from Australia and 25 lacs from India at the end of its third weekend. The film had a huge business from the overseas markets due to its big release. According to BOD, the film managed to earn 29.5 crores till third week worldwide. It did a lifetime collection of Rs 105.5 million locally and Rs 295.0 million from overseas, with a worldwide total of Rs 400.5 million.

Critical reception

Mike McCahill of The Guardian termed the film a soppy vortex and gave Bin Roye 2 stars. Ujala Ali Khan of The National gave Bin Roye 4 stars and praised the film. Bindu Rai of Emirates 24/7 praised Mahira Khan's performance but termed 'Bin Roye' as a sob fest. Nadia Lewis of Gulf News also praised the film. Amna Omer of The Nation praised Bin Roye despite its flaws and gave it 3.5 stars.
Maliha Rehman of DAWN considered the movie as "a desi version of a chick flick. But a good one and interesting enough for even men to sit through it" she also criticized casting of Humayun Saeed and thought he looked a lot older than his co-stars but praised Mahira Khan for her performance .

Sameeksha Dandriyal of IBN Live praised Mahira Khan for her intense acting but termed Bin roye an average film and gave it 2.5 stars out of 5. Aayan Mirza of Galaxy Lollywood rated the film 3.5 out of 5 stars and wrote, "Bin Roye is a complete family film with its romance and emotion portions excellently stirred up. If you have been a HUM fan in past, this film is for you. Bin Roye may not be at its best at the start of it, but don't lose hope on it just yet. Stick to it, you will go home taking with you some mesmerising performances, some beautiful scenes and some amazingly done songs". He praised the performances of Humayun Saeed, Mahira Khan, Armeena Khan and Javed Sheikh.

Sadiya Azhar of The Express Tribune rated the film 3 out of 5 stars and said, "The first half of the movie was a little slow. However, the second half of the movie managed to pull up the pace and while some scenes were shot brilliantly, some were hazy". Zahra Mirza of Reviewit praised the film due to its script, direction, locations and the performances of Humayun Saeed, Mahira Khan and Armeena Khan.

Accolades

 TV adaptation 

There is now a television series titled Bin Roye Ansoo'', currently running on Hum TV with the whole cast of the film and based on the novel of same name by Farhat Ishtiaq.

References

External links
 
 
 

2015 films
Pakistani romantic drama films
2015 romantic drama films
Films scored by Shani Arshad
Films based on Pakistani novels
Films based on romance novels
Hum films
2015 directorial debut films
Films with screenplays by Farhat Ishtiaq
2010s Urdu-language films